"The Sparrows Nest" is a lyric poem written by William Wordsworth at Town End, Grasmere, in 1801. It was first published in the collection Poems in Two Volumes in 1807.

The poem is a moving tribute to Wordsworth's sister Dorothy, recalling their early childhood together in Cockermouth before they were separated following their mother's death in 1778 when he was barely eight years old.

History

The 'Emmeline' of the poem is his sister Dorothy.

The poem itself was placed in a section of Poems in Two Volumes entitled Moods of my Mind, in which he grouped together his most deeply felt lyrics. Others included "To a Butterfly", a childhood recollection of chasing butterflies with Dorothy, and "I Wandered Lonely as a Cloud", closely based on an entry in Dorothy's journal following a walk together and an example of the line "She gave me eyes, she gave me ears" in the poem.

Sources

Bibliography 
 Davies, Hunter. William Wordsworth, Weidenfeld and Nicolson 1980
 Gill, Stephen. William Wordsworth: A Life, Oxford University Press 1989
 Gill, Stephen. "William Wordsworth: The Major Works including The Prelude, Oxford University Press 1984
 Moorman, Mary. William Wordsworth, A Biography: The Early Years, 1770–1803 v. 1, Oxford University Press 1957
 Moorman, Mary. William Wordsworth: A Biography: The Later Years, 1803–50 v. 2, Oxford University Press 1965 
 Wordsworth, Dorothy (ed. Pamela Woof). The Grasmere and Alfoxden Journals., Oxford University Press 2002

Poetry by William Wordsworth
1801 poems